Type 15 may refer to:
Type 15 frigate, a class of British anti-submarine frigates of the Royal Navy
Bugatti Typ 15, a Bugatti car
Peugeot Type 15, an early Peugeot model built from 1897 to 1901
BRM Type 15, a Formula One racing car of the early 1950s
Bristol F.2 Fighter (Bristol Type 15), a British two-seat biplane fighter and reconnaissance aircraft of the First World War
Hiro H1H (Hiro Navy Type 15 Flying boat), a 1920s Japanese bomber or reconnaissance biplane 
Type RO 15, a class of German cargo ship built in the 1980s
Type 15 tank, a light tank made by Norinco, in service in the PR China since 2015